The Kazan Gymnastics Center, is an indoor sports arena in Kazan, Russia. Built for 2013 Summer Universiade, it was inaugurated on 14 November 2012. Currently it is used for training athletes from Kazan Youth Sports Schools and Volga Region State Academy of Physical Culture, Sport and Tourism. There are also daily classes conducted by Olympic champion Yulia Barsukova

Tournament hosted
2013 Summer Universiade gymnastics competitions
2014 European Badminton Championships
2016 and 2018 European Men's and Women's Team Badminton Championships
2017 World Wushu Championships
Rhythmic Gymnastics World Cup
2019 BWF World Junior Championships

References

Indoor arenas in Russia
Gymnastics venues
Sport in Kazan
Buildings and structures in Kazan
Badminton venues